The Cathedral of Ani (Anii mayr tačar) is the largest standing building in Ani, the capital city of medieval Bagratid Armenia, located in present-day eastern Turkey, on the border with modern Armenia. Its construction was completed in the early 11th century by the architect Trdat and it was the seat of the Catholicos, the head of the Armenian Apostolic Church, for nearly half a century.

In 1064, following the Seljuk conquest of Ani, the cathedral was converted into a mosque. It later returned to being used as an Armenian church. It eventually suffered damage in a 1319 earthquake when its conical dome collapsed. Subsequently, Ani was gradually abandoned and the church fell into disrepair. The north-western corner of the church was heavily damaged by a 1988 earthquake.

The cathedral is considered the largest and most impressive structure in Ani. It is a domed basilica with a rectangular plan, though the dome and most of its supporting drum are now missing. Its use of pointed arches and cluster piers has been widely cited by scholars to have possibly influenced, or at least preceded, Gothic architecture. The cathedral, along with the entire site of Ani, was declared a World Heritage Site by the UNESCO in 2016.

Names
In modern Armenian, the cathedral is usually referred to as Անիի մայր տաճար, Anii mayr tačar and in Turkish as Ani Katedrali, both meaning "cathedral of Ani". Historically, however, it was known in Armenian as Անիի Կաթողիկե, Anii Kat'oghike. The cathedral is also known as Holy Mother of God Church of Ani (Anii Surb Astvatsatsni yekeghetsi) and the Great Cathedral of Ani (Մեծ Կաթողիկե, Mets Kat'oghike; Büyük Katedral).

History

Foundation and early history
Following more than two centuries of Arab rule, Armenia gained independence under the Bagratid (Bagratuni) dynasty around 885. King Ashot III made Ani capital in 961, after which the city emerged as a prosperous urban center with 100,000 residents at its height. The construction of the cathedral began in 989. The architect Trdat was commissioned by Bagratid King Smbat II to build a cathedral in the new capital of the Armenian kingdom. The construction was halted when Smbat died in 989, according to an inscription on the south wall. Meanwhile, Trdat was hired to direct the repairs of the dome of the Hagia Sophia in Constantinople, which had collapsed in an earthquake. Trdat returned from Constantinople in 993. The construction was continued and completed by Queen Katranide (Katramide), the wife of King Gagik I, Smbat's brother and successor. It was completed either in 1001 or 1010. According to Christina Maranci the generally accepted date of completion is 1001, but it may have extended until 1010. The contradiction is based on the reading of the inscription of the cathedral's northern wall. The cathedral served as the seat of the catholicos, the head of the Armenian Apostolic Church from its foundation in 1001 until the mid-11th century (1046 or 1051). Thus, for around half a century Ani was both the religious and secular center of Armenia.

A silver cross originally stood on its conical dome and a crystal chandelier, bought by King Smbat II from India, hang in the cathedral. In the 1010s, during the reign of Catholicos Sarkis I, a mausoleum dedicated to the Hripsimean virgins was erected next to the cathedral. The mausoleum was built on some of the remnants of the virgins brought from Vagharshapat (Etchmiadzin). In the 1040s–1050s inscriptions were left on the cathedral's eastern and western walls about urban projects, such as restoration of defensive walls, installation of water pipes and easing of the tax burden on the residents of Ani.

Later history

Ani surrendered to the Byzantine Empire in 1045, who held it until 1064, when the city was captured by the Seljuks, led by Alp Arslan. Alp Arslan and his soldiers performed their first prayer in Ani at the cathedral. Consequently, the cathedral was converted into a mosque and called Fethiye Mosque. Official Turkish sources often refer to it by that name.

In 1124 a crescent was placed on the cathedral's dome by the Shaddadid amir of Ani. In response, Ani's Armenians appealed to King David IV of Georgia to capture Ani, after which the cathedral returned to Christian usage. However, only two years later, in 1126, Ani came under the control of the Shaddadids. During the 12th century historians Mkhitar Anetsi, Samuel Anetsi and philosopher Hovhannes Sarkavag served at the cathedral in various capacities. Mkhitar was an elder priest at the cathedral in the second half of the century. In 1198 Ani was conquered by the Georgian-Armenian Zakarid (Mkhargrdzeli) princes, under whose control the cathedral prospered. In 1213 the wealthy merchant Tigran Honents restored the cathedral's steps.

Decay
Ani's long-term decline began in 1239 when Mongols sacked the city and massacred its population. In 1319 a devastating earthquake struck Ani. It resulted in the collapse of the cathedral's conical roof. Ani was completely deserted by the 18th century. The drum reportedly collapsed during an 1832 or 1840 earthquake. Varazdat Harutyunyan insists the entire dome collapsed in 1319.

The north-western corner of the cathedral was heavily damaged by a 1988 earthquake with its epicenter in modern Armenia's north. It resulted in a large gaping hole. According to VirtualAni it also caused "a serious rent in the south-west corner; by 1998 parts of the roof here had started to fall." Lavrenti Barseghian wrote in 2003 that the damage from the earthquake was so great that the entire building would collapse unless strengthened and restored.

Explosions in a quarry on the Armenian side of the border, across the Akhurian River, reportedly caused some damage to the cathedral in the early 2000s. In mid-June 2001 an "ear-splitting explosion rocked the site just as a group of Armenian Americans had gathered to pray at the cathedral." Armenian architectural historian Samvel Karapetyan, who witnessed the explosions on the Armenian side during his visit to Ani in July 2000, stated that the explosions continued until 2004/2005. However, Turkish accusations continued until 2008. According to Vercihan Ziflioğlu, writing for the Hürriyet, it was only in 2009 that Armenia halted blasting activities, reportedly, after Turkey's complaint at the International Council on Monuments and Sites (ICOMOS).

In the mid-2000s, Turkish guards had dug a large hole in their quest for treasure on the floor of the apse of the cathedral. Moreover, treasure hunters dug out the grave of what may have been that of Queen Katranide beside the west façade of the cathedral. It had been uncovered by French archaeologists in 2002–03. Additional gravestones with Armenian inscriptions nearby were upturned.

Preservation efforts

Ani has been listed on the World Monuments Watch by World Monuments Fund (WMF) since 1996. In May 2011 the WMF and the Turkish Ministry of Culture launched a conservation project focusing on the cathedral and the nearby Church of the Redeemer. The project is funded by the Ambassadors Fund for Cultural Preservation of the U.S. State Department. Before the project, a steel structure was installed around the cathedral, in order to prevent its cracked sandstone walls from collapsing. The WMF and its Turkish partner, Anadolu Kültür, said they will work on "stabilization and protection" of the cathedral. Turkey's Minister of Culture Ertuğrul Günay stated "We hope that giving new life to the remains of once-splendid buildings, such as the Ani Cathedral and church, will bring new economic opportunities to the region." Armenian officials responded with skepticism.

According to Gagik Gyurjyan, president of ICOMOS-Armenia, the Turkish Culture Ministry rejected the preliminary agreement between Anadolu Kültür and the Armenian side to engage Armenian experts in restoration works. Osman Kavala, president of Anadolu Kültür, stated that the lack of formal bilateral relations between Armenia and Turkey may have prevented Armenian experts from being included in the project. Kavala stated in a 2011 interview that an estimated $1 million would be spent on the project, which was scheduled to start in 2012 and end in 4 years. Yavuz Özkaya, an architect who participated in the projects carried out in Ani, stated in March 2014 that studies on preservation and restoration of the cathedral were completed and they had begun to be implemented. These works included clearing the roofs, installing a temporary structure at the separation point between the western and southern walls, strengthening, proper completion of roof tiles and taking preventative measures.

The archaeological site of Ani was inscribed as a UNESCO World Heritage Site on July 15, 2016. According to art historian Heghnar Watenpaugh the addition "would secure significant benefits in protection, research expertise, and funding." In April 2018 Necmettin Alp, director of the Kars Museum, stated that restoration works on the cathedral would start later that month. In 2019 World Monuments Fund (WMF) and Anadolu Kültür began an "emergency temporary intervention" for the preservation of the cathedral. In 2021 WMF, with the support of the International alliance for the protection of heritage in conflict areas (ALIPH Foundation), began a second phase "focusing on the implementation of a long-term intervention plan for the restoration of the entire cathedral."

Architecture

Overview
The cathedral is a domed, centrally-planned basilica. Varazdat Harutyunyan argues that in its plan and dimensions, it reproduces two 7th century domed basilicas—Cathedral of Mren and Saint Gayane Church. According to Richard Krautheimer it derives its plan from that of the 7th century Cathedral of Talin, with only minor differences. The dome was supported on pendentives and stood atop the "intersection of four barrel vaults elevated to a cruciform design and topped with gabled roofs." In the interior, "freestanding piers divide the space into three aisles, the nave of which terminates in an eastern apse flanked by two story side chapels." Sirarpie Der Nersessian noted that its interior is imposing "through the harmony of the proportions." She added, "The blind arcade with slender columns and ornate arches, the delicate interlaces carved around the door and windows add to the beauty of the exterior."

The cathedral is built, primarily, of yellow, but also black and red polished tuff. It has three entrances. The main one is on the western side. The entrances on the northern and southern sides, though secondary, are richly decorated. Its windows are narrow and long, with ornamented frames. Grigoris Balakian opined that its interior, built of large polished stones, "appears to be more impressive than the outside."

Dimensions
It is very large by the standards of Armenian architecture. Murad Hasratyan argues that its large size and rich ornaments symbolize the revived Armenian statehood under the Bagratids. Christina Maranci suggested what she describes as an "extremely tentative" hypothesis that the relatively large proportion of the cathedral may have been a "reflection of Trdat's memory of the vast continuous spaces" of Hagia Sophia in Constantinople, the dome of which he repaired. H. F. B. Lynch argued that it is small if judged by European standards, but is "nevertheless a stately building." Luigi Villari wrote in his 1906 book on travels in the Caucasus: "From a distance it seems to be merely a plain rectangular structure with no architectural pretensions. But on closer inspection it proves to be a building of really great beauty and of the most perfect proportions."

Scholarly assessment
The cathedral is widely considered a masterpiece of Armenian architecture. It is the largest and most impressive structure of Ani. Armen Kazaryan describes it as the most significant structure of the entire Bagratid period. The cathedral is known for its novel design features. Authors of Global History of Architecture (2010) wrote that it "deserves to be listed among the principal monuments of the time because of its pointed arches and clustered columns and piers."

Sirarpie Der Nersessian argued that it "deserves to be listed among the important examples of medieval architecture." David Roden Buxton suggested that it "is worthy ... of far greater renown that actually surrounds it." H. F. B. Lynch described it as a "monument of the highest artistic merit, denoting a standard of culture which was far in advance of the contemporary standards in the West."  Josef Strzygowski argued that the cathedral is the most valuable achievement of Armenian architecture from the European viewpoint. David Marshall Lang wrote that the cathedral's building techniques are "far ahead of the contemporary Anglo-Saxon and Norman architecture of western Europe."

Richard Phené Spiers wrote in the 11th century of Encyclopædia Britannica (1911):

Imitations in Armenian architecture

The main church of Marmashen monastery (dated 988–1029) is considered a miniature of Ani Cathedral. Richard Krautheimer wrote that the exterior walls of both the church of Marmashen and the cathedral of Ani are "articulated by blind arcades resting on slender colonnettes, single or in pairs." There are significant structural differences between the two. Stepan Mnatsakanian noted that the similarities are limited to the exterior decorations because there are significant differences in their floor plans.

The ground plan of Holy Saviour's Church in Gyumri, completed in 1873, is based on that of Ani Cathedral. However, the church is significantly larger than the cathedral and is not an exact replica of the latter.

The blind arcades on the three apses of the Armenian Cathedral of Lviv—added sometime before 1902—are a "surprisingly faithful reproduction of an analogous decoration" on the external walls of cathedral of Ani.

Association with Gothic architecture
Some European scholars, especially scholars of the Near East, have suggested that the use of pointed arches and clustered piers in the cathedral influenced the development of Gothic architecture. The theory was popularized by Josef Strzygowski, who was the first European to thoroughly study Armenian architecture and placed Armenia in the center of European architecture. Strzygowski wrote in the Origin of Christian Church Art (1920): "It is a delight, in a church earlier than AD 1000, to see the builder, the court architect Trdat, carrying Armenian art so logically and so successfully past 'Romanesque' to 'Gothic'." Several others had proposed this view before him, including H. F. B. Lynch (1901), William Lethaby (1912), and others. Lynch suggested that the cathedral has "many of the characteristics of the Gothic style, of which it establishes the Oriental origin." Lethaby found the cathedral "strangely western." In examining the possible influence of Caucasian architecture in the West, David Roden Buxton wrote on the cathedral of Ani in 1937:

Cecil Stewart noted that the most interesting features of the cathedral are its "pointed arches and vaults and the clustering or coupling of the columns in the Gothic manner." For David Talbot Rice the cathedral is "astonishingly Gothic in every detail." David Marshall Lang argued that the appearance of pointed arches and clustered piers together is "considered one of the hallmarks of mature Gothic architecture." Christina Maranci argues that the cathedral, with it "profiled piers and arches ... anticipate, in their linear elegance, the Gothic styles of buildings like Notre-Dame."

Rouben Paul Adalian wrote, "the interior with its pointed arches and clustered piers rising to the ribbed ceiling vaults, included innovations whose parallels would appear in Gothic architecture in Western Europe a century later." The theory has found support among Armenian architecture historians, such as Toros Toramanian, Tiran Marutian, Murad Hasratyan. The hypothesized influence on the Gothic has also been noted by World Monuments Fund and the Ambassadors Fund for Cultural Preservation.

Criticism and response
Art historian Sirarpie Der Nersessian rejected the postulated "proto-Gothic" character of the ogival arches of the cathedral of Ani which, she argued, "do not serve the same function in supporting the vault." Although Adrian Stokes saw the cathedral as holding "some balance between wall architecture and the linear Gothic to come," he did not find "the feeling for mass and space that transfixes him at Rimini or Luciano Laurana's Quattro Cento courtyard in the Palace of Urbino." The website Virtual Ani writes that there is "no evidence to indicate that there was a connection between Armenian architecture and the development of the Gothic style in Western Europe." Lucy Der Manuelian argues that there is a documented evidence of the presence of Armenians in Western Europe during the Middle Ages, who could have carried this information to the West.

Symbolism and significance for Armenians

In 1989 a series of events under the title "The Glory of Ani" commemorating the millennium of the Cathedral of Ani took place in the United States, sponsored by the Eastern Prelacy of the Armenian Apostolic Church of America. A symposium took place at the New-York Historical Society on October 21, 1989.

In June 2011 the graduation ceremony of history students of Yerevan State University (YSU) was held at the cathedral. Since then graduation ceremonies of some departments of the YSU have taken place at the cathedral. Folk dance director Gagik Ginosyan and his wife, along with their friends, staged a wedding ceremony at the cathedral.

In September 2011 researchers of the Shirak Armenology Research Center of the National Academy of Sciences of Armenia made a pilgrimage to the cathedral, where they performed scientific readings on the history of Ani.

In Turkish politics
Turkish President Abdullah Gül visited the cathedral on July 23, 2008 during his visit to Ani.

2010 Muslim prayer
On October 1, 2010 a Muslim prayer was performed at the cathedral by members and supporters of the far-right Nationalist Movement Party (MHP). The formal occasion was to commemorate the 1064 Seljuk conquest of Ani, but it was widely seen as a nationalist retaliation for the Christian mass—the first since the Armenian Genocide of 1915—at the Cathedral of Aghtamar at Lake Van on September 19. Some two thousand people, including senior members of the MHP, such as party leader Devlet Bahçeli, participated in the prayer.  The crowd waved Turkish flags and chanted Allahu Akbar before saying prayers in and around the cathedral. They were accompanied by an Ottoman-style military marching band. The prayer was authorized by the Turkish Ministry of Culture, and was attended by believers from Azerbaijan and broadcast live by three Azerbaijani TV channels.

The prayer was widely denounced for its political nature. An MP from the ruling AKP called it an illegal "political show" connected with the Aghtamar mass, while art historian Heghnar Watenpaugh described the event as an example of "political stagecraft." According to Aris Nalcı of the Turkish-Armenian daily Agos it was "addressed to Turks, rather than Armenians." According to commentary prepared by the Yapı Kredi Bank Economic Research, "the scene looked awkward to a large majority of Turks." Hürriyet Daily News columnist Yusuf Kanlı described it as an "attempt [by Bahçeli] to woo and win back the lost nationalist-conservative vote." Turkish-Armenian journalist Markar Esayan wrote in Taraf that what Bahçeli did at Ani was "in fact exploitation of religion."

The Armenian Apostolic Church accused the Turkish authorities in "destroying Armenian monuments and misappropriating historical Armenian holy sites and cultural treasures." Architecture scholar Samvel Karapetyan commented sarcastically: "We now have reason to be happy. For centuries, our churches were desecrated and turned into toilets, whereas now they are only doing a namaz [sic]."

2020 incident
In February 2020 a video appeared online in which a woman sang meyhane music on the bema of the cathedral while Pervin Ersoy, the wife of Mehmet Ersoy, Turkey's Minister of Culture and Tourism, was shown standing in the crowd and clapping.

Gallery

Historic and artistic depictions

References 
Notes

References

Sources

Further reading

External links

Program about the Ani Cathedral by Vem Radio

Churches completed in 1001
11th-century mosques
11th century in Armenia
Armenian Apostolic churches in Turkey
Armenian Apostolic cathedrals in Turkey
1001 establishments
Oriental Orthodox congregations established in the 10th century
Religious buildings and structures converted into mosques
Bagratid Armenia
Armenian buildings in Turkey
Ani